The 2008 Men's European Volleyball League was the fifth edition of the European Volleyball League, organised by Europe's governing volleyball body, the CEV. The final Four was held in Bursa, Turkey from 19 to 20 July 2008.

For the first time Great Britain joined the competition and it will also enter it as a unified team as a result of a FIVB decision which allows the United Kingdom to play as a unified team in order to prepare for the next 2012 Summer Olympics in London. Austria and Belarus also joined the European League for the first time.

The tournament was won by Slovakia, defeating the Netherlands by 3–1 in the finals.

Competing Nations

Squads

League round

Pool A

|}

Pool B

|}

Final four

Semi-finals

3rd place match

Final

Final standing

Awards

Most Valuable Player
  Martin Sopko
Best Scorer
  György Grozer
Best Spiker
  Volkan Güç
Best Blocker
  Tomas Kmet
Best Server
  Martin Sopko
Best Setter
  Yannick van Harskamp
Best Receiver
  Ferdinand Tille
Best Libero
  Jelte Maan

References
 Official website

European Volleyball League
E
Men's European Volleyball League
League
Sport in Bursa